Compton station is an at-grade light rail station on the A Line of the Los Angeles Metro Rail system. The station is located alongside the Union Pacific freight railroad's Wilmington Subdivision (the historic route of the Pacific Electric Railway), at its intersection with Compton Boulevard, after which the station is named, in the city of Compton, California.

Service

Station layout

Hours and frequency

Connections 
On May 8, 2011, Metro and Compton City Officials opened the new Martin Luther King Jr. Transit Center adjacent to Compton Station. The transit center has eight new bus bays and allows easy and safe access to the rail station.

, the following connections are available:
Compton Renaissance Transit: 1, 2, 3, 4, 5
GTrans (Gardena): 3
Greyhound Lines

Notable places nearby 
The station is within walking distance of the following notable places:
 Compton Civic Center and Dr. Martin Luther King Jr. Memorial
 Compton High School
 Gateway Towne Center

References

A Line (Los Angeles Metro) stations
Railway stations in the United States opened in 1990
Compton, California
1990 establishments in California
Pacific Electric stations